The men's singles competition of the 2021 World Table Tennis Championships was held from 23 to 29 November 2021.

Ma Long was the three-time defending champion, but did not compete in this year's tournament.

Fan Zhendong won the title after defeating Truls Möregårdh 11–6, 11–9, 11–7, 11–8.

Seeds
Seeding was based on the ITTF world ranking published on 16 November 2021.

  Fan Zhendong (champion)
  Tomokazu Harimoto (second round)
  Hugo Calderano (quarterfinals)
  Lin Yun-ju (third round)
  Lin Gaoyuan (quarterfinals)
  Liang Jingkun (semifinals)
  Mattias Falck (second round)
  Timo Boll (semifinals)
  Jang Woo-jin (first round)
  Patrick Franziska (third round)
  Liam Pitchford (fourth round)
  Wang Chuqin (fourth round)
  Quadri Aruna (quarterfinals)
  Simon Gauzy (third round)
  Koki Niwa (second round)
  Lee Sang-su  (second round)
  Wong Chun Ting (fourth round)
  Darko Jorgić (fourth round)
  Marcos Freitas (second round)
  Chuang Chih-yuan (second round)
  Robert Gardos (second round)
  Kristian Karlsson (fourth round)
  Omar Assar (first round)
  Sharath Kamal (first round)
  Kanak Jha (quarterfinals)
  Jonathan Groth (third round)
  Tomislav Pucar (third round)
  Yang Wang (fourth round, withdrawn)
  Ruwen Filus (fourth round)
  Sathiyan Gnanasekaran (third round)
  Gustavo Tsuboi (second round)
  Emmanuel Lebesson (third round)

Draw

Finals

Top half

Section 1

Section 2

Section 3

Section 4

Bottom half

Section 5

Section 6

Section 7

Section 8

References

External links
Draw

Men's singles